The following list is a list of Teen Choice Award winners and nominees for Choice Male Athlete. David Beckham receives the most wins with 6.

Winners and nominees

1999

2000s

2010s

References

Male Athlete
American sports trophies and awards